Leon Brown (born November 16, 1949 in Sacramento, California) is a former outfielder in Major League Baseball. He is the brother of Curtis Brown.

Leon Brown was drafted by the Baltimore Orioles in the 1966 amateur draft out of Grant Union High School in Sacramento, California.  He then went on to spend thirteen years in professional baseball, mostly in the minor leagues. Brown had 74 plate appearances in 64 games as a New York Met in 1976, recording a .214 batting average as an outfielder. He was traded with Brock Pemberton from the Mets to the St. Louis Cardinals for minor-league first baseman Ed Kurpiel on December 9, 1976.

His son Channing Brown has played for various collegiate and professional baseball teams including Chandler-Gilbert Community College, Lipscomb University, San Diego Surf Dawgs, Team Canada, Lake County Fielders, and the Prescott Montezuma Federals.

References

External links

1949 births
Living people
Baseball players from Sacramento, California
New York Mets players
Major League Baseball outfielders
Miami Amigos players
Sacramento State Hornets baseball players
African-American baseball players
Aberdeen Pheasants players
Amarillo Giants players
Arkansas Travelers players
Bluefield Orioles players
Dallas–Fort Worth Spurs players
Iowa Oaks players
New Orleans Pelicans (baseball) players
Omaha Royals players
Phoenix Giants players
Stockton Ports players
Tidewater Tides players